Johan Brunström (born 3 April 1980) is a professional Swedish tennis player. His highest ATP doubles ranking is no. 31, which he reached on 22 March 2010. His career high in singles is no. 377, which he reached on 24 September 2007.  He made his Davis Cup debut against Serbia in February 2012, with a win in doubles with partner Robert Lindstedt.

In June 2012, he reached the second round of Wimbledon men's doubles partnering Philipp Marx. They lost to David Marrero and Andreas Seppi.  At the 2012 Summer Olympics, he reached the second round of the men's doubles with Lindstedt.

Performance timeline

Doubles

ATP career finals

Doubles: 19 (5 titles, 14 runner-ups)

ATP Challenger and ITF Futures finals

Singles: 5 (2–3)

Doubles: 53 (31–22)

References

External links

 
 

Swedish male tennis players
Living people
1980 births
Tennis players at the 2012 Summer Olympics
Olympic tennis players of Sweden
21st-century Swedish people